Origination in VOIP telephony refers to calls that originate in the PSTN public switched telephone network and are carried to their destination over the Internet.

A VoIP call is initiated between two points, the initiation point is known as originator and the destination point is known as terminator.

An Internet Telephony Service Provider (ITSP) involved in the origination of telephone calls usually offers either or both of “PC to Phone calls” and “Phone to Phone calls”.  The two major business models for VoIP Originator are “Prepaid” and “Postpaid”.  
Hardware requirements for VoIP origination are simple. The only hardware needed is a gateway that takes calls off the Internet and delivers them onto PSTN lines. All VoIP originators require a call termination arrangement with a terminator called VoIP terminator.

Introduction

An ITSP (Internet Telephony Service Provider) involved in the origination of telephone calls usually offers either or both of:

• PC to Phone calls 
• Phone to Phone calls

The two major business models are:

• Prepaid 
• Postpaid

Hardware requirements 

Hardware requirements for VoIP origination are simple. The only hardware needed is a gateway that takes calls off the Internet and delivers them onto PSTN lines. A gateway therefore has two types of Interfaces.

1. An Ethernet interface that connects the gateway to the Internet.

2. One or more telephony interfaces taking analog or digital phone lines.

An analog line can take one phone call at a time while a digital line can take more. A T1 line takes 24 calls and supports 1.5 Mbits while an E1 line takes 30 calls and supports 2Mbits simultaneously. A typical digital gateway has 4 T1s or 4 E1s

Flow of Call 

A gatekeeper is an application that receives the registration requests and calls from a dialer. When a user signs into the dialer, the request goes to the gatekeeper. The gatekeeper asks the Radius server to see if the username and password are correct and valid. The Radius server queries the database and sends a yes/no reply to the gatekeeper. If authenticated, the user can then make phone calls from the dialer. 
When the user dials a phone number in the dialer, the request again goes to the gatekeeper, gatekeeper again asks the Radius server if the user is allowed to make this call and has enough money to initiate it. The Radius server asks the billing server for the maximum duration of call can be allowed to  this user based on the amount of money remaining in his account or prepaid card. The billing solution looks up the destination of the call, finds the appropriate rate based on the peak/ off peak hours and the type of the customer and informs the Radius server exact duration in seconds that the user can call to this destination. The same info is returned by the Radius server to the gatekeeper and the gatekeeper informs the dialer the IP address of the destination gateway that can deliver the voice call to the destination. Given this information, the call is initiated if nothing else goes wrong and the two parties can talk. If they continue to talk until the maximum allowed duration of the call, the call is disconnected by the gatekeeper, so the user doesn't consume any amount above the available limit.

Whenever a call is disconnected naturally or forcefully by the gatekeeper, the gatekeeper informs the billing application with the details of that call. The billing application computes the total call charges and deducts the amount from the calling customer's account or prepaid card.

Termination Requirements

All VoIP originators require a call termination arrangement with a terminator called VoIP terminator. There are different companies which provide termination to specific destinations and there are others that provide termination to all the destinations. The latter are usually called A-Z terminators and are more convenient for start-up companies to work with.

PC to Phone Business

A PC to Phone provider first arranges a softphone also called a dialer. He then puts the dialer somewhere on the Internet from where the customers can download and install it.

Once the dialer is installed, the customer can do a sign-up and make his account. This can either be done by using his credit card or by buying a prepaid calling card from the market. There are companies such as AdvancedDialer.com which provide dialers which have a different look and feel and can also brand the dialer to your individual business name.

The ITSP needs to arrange a set of servers that will run the basic setup to allow them to receive dialer calls and send them to different terminators for delivery. This setup requires the following applications:

1. A gatekeeper

2. A billing application

3. A Radius application

4. A database application.

Phone-to-Phone Business 

Phone-to-Phone business is similar in nature to PC to Phone business, except for the fact that the ITSP now also needs to arrange for originating gateways. A gateway is a device that can receive a phone call over PSTN and convert it into IP for delivery over Internet. 
A gateway usually has a fixed number of ports. Analog gateways take analog phone lines while digital gateways take digital phone lines. See the “Basics of VoIP” white paper for details of analog and digital lines. Once the gateway has converted the PSTN call to IP, the rest of the delivery is the same as it is in the PC to Phone case.

In a PC dialer, a user can enter their username and password which is enough to identify the user. The username can be the PIN on a prepaid card along with its respective password.

In the phone-to-phone scenario, an IVR (interactive voice response) system is required with the gateway to prompt the customer for their PIN. The PIN entered by the customer is taken by the gateway or gatekeeper and given to the Radius server for authorization.

Prepaid and Postpaid 

VoIP origination is mostly prepaid nowadays. This means that the customer prepays the amount either through their credit card or buys a prepaid calling card. As soon as the card or credit is finished, the customer is disconnected and needs to recharge the account or buy a new card from the market. In postpaid, the ITSP sends an invoice at the end of the accounting period, usually a month, and the customer pays later.

Voice over IP